Gārsene Parish is an administrative unit of Jēkabpils Municipality in the Selonia region of Latvia (prior to 2009 it was part of the former Jēkabpils District).

References

Parishes of Latvia
Jēkabpils Municipality
Selonia